Inspector Chocolate is a 1986 Hong Kong crime comedy film co-written and directed by Philip Chan, and also co-written, produced by and starring Michael Hui. The film co-stars Anita Mui, Ricky Hui, Sibelle Hu and Roy Chiao.

Overview 
The film Inspector Chocolate is also known as Chocolate Inspector. The film's original title is Shen tan zhu gu li (Mr. Boo: Inspector Chocolate). The film's Chinese title is 神探朱古力. In Japan, the film is known as Mr. Boo 8: Inspector Chocolate.

Plot
Although Chu Koo-lik (Chocolate) (Michael Hui) believes himself to have outstanding abilities, he has only reached the rank of Inspector despite working many years in the police force. Along with his cowardly assistant, Egg Tart (Ricky Hui), Chocolate is often occupied with nothing at the police station. One day, Chocolate's superior, Captain Wu (Roy Chiao), arranges his newcomer daughter, Kiu-kiu (Anita Mui) to work under Chocolate. However, Kiu-kiu and Chocolate dislike each other. Because Captain Wu deeply loves his daughter, he assigns simple cases to Chocolate, increasing Chocolate's dislike for Kiu-kiu.

Chocolate later receives a missing person case. Although he initially was uninterested, as the investigation goes on, the case suddenly took a dramatic turn, and full of mystery surrounds. Chocolate is determined to solve this case, with Kiu-kiu and Egg Tart under his wing.

Cast
Michael Hui as Inspector Chu Koo-lik (Chocolate)
Anita Mui as Kiu-kiu
Ricky Hui as Egg Tart
Sibelle Hu as Mrs. Lam Mei-mei
Roy Chiao as Captain K.W. Wu
Agnes Cheung as Inspector Apple Man
Michael Chan as Imposter of kidnapper
Lo Chun-man as Mrs. Lam's elder son
Lo Chun-kit as Mrs. Lam's missing son
Sandra Lang as Ms. Aberdeen "crazy woman"
Tai Po as Jesus
Dennis Chan as TV producer
Elvis Tsui as Child smuggler
Mai Kei as Child smuggler driving 18wheel
Fung Hak-on as Chen Long
Michael Chow as Inspector Leung
Tin Ching as Cafe manager
Cheng Mang-ha as Toilet attendant
Maria Cordero as Woman in toilet (cameo)
Chow Mei-fung as Shopper at department shop
Shrila Chun as Councillor Hui
Felix Lok as Mr. Ho, Savory Cake Shop manager
 Annie Liu as Cooking show host
 Kam Kong-shing as Cooking show host
 Chui Fook-chuen
 Kwok Suk-king
 Yuet-ching Lee as Mrs. Lam's mother
K.K. Wong as School principal
Yat-poon Chai as Police sergeant at parade
Eddie Chan as Policeman
Fei Pak as Policeman
Wong Chi-wing as Policeman
 Simon Cheung as Policeman
 Alric Ma as Policeman
 Lam Shung-ching as Policeman
 Sally Kwok
 Lam Chi-tai

Reception

Critical
Andrew Saroch of Far East Films rated the film a score of 4 out of 5 stars, praising Philip Chan's director and the performances of the main cast, especially Michael Hui, noting how "it is always a joy to watch how Michael bumbles his way through while his face betrays little emotion." Hong Kong Digital gave the film a core of 7/10 and praises the film's script, its humor and Hui's comedic timing.

Box office
The film grossed HK$22,485,500 at the Hong Kong box office during its theatrical run from 19 December 1986 to 8 January 1987.

Awards and nominations

References

External links
 Inspector Chocolate at hkmdb.com
''Inspector Chocolate at hkcinemagic.com 

 Chocolate Inspector at tcm.com
 Chocolate Inspector at fareastfilms.com

1986 films
1980s crime comedy films
Hong Kong crime comedy films
Hong Kong slapstick comedy films
Police detective films
1980s Cantonese-language films
Golden Harvest films
Films about missing people
Films about kidnapping
Films set in Hong Kong
Films shot in Hong Kong
1986 comedy films
Films directed by Philip Chan
1980s Hong Kong films